1748 in philosophy

Events

Publications 
 David Hume's An Enquiry Concerning Human Understanding
 Montesquieu's The Spirit of the Laws
 Julien Offray de La Mettrie's Man a Machine

Births 
 February 6 - Adam Weishaupt (died 1830)
 February 15 - Jeremy Bentham (died 1832)
 April 3 - Dietrich Tiedemann (died 1803)
 April 27 - Adamantios Korais (died 1833)
 May 7 - Olympe de Gouges (died 1793)

Deaths 
April 3 - Jean-Jacques Burlamaqui

References 

Philosophy
18th-century philosophy
Philosophy by year